The Uppland Regiment, designation I 8, was a Swedish Army infantry regiment that traced its origins back to the 16th century. It was disbanded in 1957. The regiment's soldiers were originally recruited from the province of Uppland, and it was later garrisoned there.

History 
The regiment has its origins in fänikor (companies) raised in Uppland in the 1550s and 1560s. In 1617, these units—along with fänikor from the nearby provinces of Dalarna and Västmanland—were organised by Gustav II Adolf into Upplands storregemente, of which eight of the total 24 companies were recruited in Uppland. Upplands storregemente consisted of three field regiments, of which Uppland Regiment was one. Sometime around 1623, the grand regiment was permanently split into 3 smaller regiments, of which Uppland Regiment was one.

The regiment was officially raised in 1626 although it had existed since 1623. Upplands regemente was one of the original 20 Swedish infantry regiments mentioned in the Swedish constitution of 1634. The regiment's first commander was Nils Brahe. It was allotted in 1682 as one of the first regiments to be so.

The regiment was given the designation I 8 (8th Infantry Regiment) in a general order in 1816. Uppland Regiment was renamed Uppland Infantry Regiment in 1904 to distinguish it from Uppland Artillery Regiment. The regiment was garrisoned in Uppsala from 1912. In 1928, the regiment regained its old name. The regiment was disbanded in 1957. The signal regiment Uppland Signal Regiment was renamed to Uppland Regiment in 1974, but does not trace its origins from the original regiment, even though the victory names have been transferred to it.

Campaigns 
?

Organisation 

1682(?)
Livkompaniet
Överstelöjtnantens kompani
Majorens kompani
Hundra härads kompani
Rasbo kompani
Sigtuna kompani
Hagunda kompani
Bälings kompani

18??
Livkompanie
Rasbo kompani
Olands kompani
Uppsala kompani
Hundra Härads kompani
Sigtuna kompani
Hagunda kompani
Enköpings kompani

Heraldry and traditions

Colours, standards and guidons
The regiment has carried a number of colour  over the years. On 3 July 1855, His Majesty the King Oscar I presented a new colour to the regiment's two battalions. The two colours only had two battle honours, Lützen and Kliszow. On 27 September 1955, His Majesty the King Gustaf VI Adolf presented a colour, which replaced the 1855 colours. The new colour had 12 battle honours. The colour was on 30 March 1957 handed over to the Uppland Signal Regiment, which carried it alongside its original colour.

Coat of arms
The coat of the arms of the Uppland Regiment (I 8). It was used by Uppland Group 2000–2005 and by the Uppland and Västmanland Group since 2005. Blazon: "Gules, the provincial badge of Uppland, an orb or, banded and ensigned with a cross-crosslet. The shield surmounted two swords in saltire or".

Medals

Heritage
Following the decision of the Riksdag on the disbandment of the regiment, a ceremony was held on 10 March 1957. After the regiment was disbanded, the regiment's traditions were continued Uppland Signal Regiment, which also assumed the name of Uppland Regiment. From 2007, the traditions of the regiment were passed on to the Command and Control Regiment. From 1 July 2013, the regimental traditions will be continued by the Uppland Battalion, part of the Uppland and Västmanland Group.

Commanding officers
Regimental commander active from 1698 to 1957.

1698–1705: O W Löwe(n)
1705–1706: J V von Daldorff
1706–1709: G F de Frietzcyk
1709–1709: G Stiernhöök
1709–1710: J Braun
1710–1710: C Ekeblad
1710–1711: G Ribbing
1711–1721: G W Fleetwood
1721–1723: G Oxenstierna
1723–1728: O J Koskull
1728–1730: O W Staël von Holstein
1730–1737: O M Wolffelt
1737–1741: W L Taube
1741–1748: C M de Laval
1748–1757: Fredrik Henrik Sparre
1757–1759: C J Mörner
1759–1772: T G Rudbeck
1772–1772: Per Scheffer
1772–1788: Fabian Casimir Wrede
1788–1791: Fabian Wrede
1791–1794: Adam Ludvig Lewenhaupt
1794–1810: Adolf Ludvig von Schwerin
1810–1816: Gustaf Olof Lagerbring
1816–1825: C A Hård
1825–1837: S D Sparre
1837–1854: C L Daevel
1854–1860: A L Rappe
1860–1862: A F Z Reuterskiöld
1862–1865: J A Sundmark
1865–1881: Otto Mauritz von Knorring
1881–1888: S G R von Bahr
1888–1899: L W Stiernstedt
1899–1905: Bengt Erland Eberhard von Hofsten
1905–1911: Curt Johan Elof Rosenblad
1911–1923: Claës Sundin
1923–1928: Bo Boustedt
1928–1935: Carl Schöning
1935–1940: Helmer Bratt
1940–1942: Sven Ryman
1942–1950: Olle Norman
1950–1957: Carl Axel Grewell

Names, designations and locations

See also 
List of Swedish infantry regiments

Footnotes

References

Notes

Print

Further reading

Infantry regiments of the Swedish Army
Disbanded units and formations of Sweden
Military units and formations established in 1626
Military units and formations disestablished in 1709
Military units and formations established in 1709
Military units and formations disestablished in 1957
1626 establishments in Sweden
1957 disestablishments in Sweden
Uppsala Garrison